Pizza is a 2005 coming-of-age comedy film written and directed by Mark Christopher, filmed in and around Milford, Pennsylvania, in 2003. It was screened at the Seattle International Film Festival on May 27, 2005, and had a limited release on January 20, 2006. The region 1 DVD was released on October 24, 2006.

Plot
Cara-Ethyl (Kylie Sparks) is an eccentric and sheltered girl on the eve of her eighteenth birthday who desperately dreams of an exciting life. But she's left with her blind, clueless (but well-meaning) mother (Julie Hagerty), a pest of a brother and made-up friends (Cara pretends she has a friend for her mother).

All that is changed when the pizza man, Matt Firenze (Ethan Embry), comes to the door. Soon, Cara persuades Matt to allow her to go with him on his deliveries. As the night progresses, Cara-Ethyl and Matt impart their wisdom and learn from each other, and both are forced to evaluate their lives.

Cast
Ethan Embry as Matt Firenze
Kylie Sparks as Cara-Ethyl
Alexis Dziena as Emily 
Julie Hagerty as Darlene
Judah Friedlander as Jimmy
Marylouise Burke as Aunt Grandma
Richard Easton as Mr. Mitchell
Jessica Dunphy as Desire
Julia Kay as Gina Morrissey
Jesse McCartney as Justin Bridges

References

External links
 
 
 

2005 films
2000s coming-of-age comedy films
American coming-of-age comedy films
2005 comedy films
2000s English-language films
2000s American films